Cibakháza is a large village in Jász-Nagykun-Szolnok county, in the Northern Great Plain region of central Hungary.

Geography

External links

  in Hungarian

Populated places in Jász-Nagykun-Szolnok County